Håøya is an island in Langesundfjorden in Porsgrunn municipality, Norway.

Its area is 2.4 km². It is known among others from summer camps arranged by Oluf Reed-Olsen.

References 

Islands of Vestfold og Telemark